J. W. Robinson Co., Robinson's, was a chain of department stores operating in the Southern California and Arizona area, previously with headquarters in Los Angeles, California.

History
Joseph Winchester Robinson was a merchant from Waltham, Massachusetts who moved to Riverside, California in 1882 to develop orange groves. Robinson found the quality of goods and service from local merchants lacking, and reentered the retail business, utilizing his contacts on the East Coast to deliver superior merchandise.

Robinson opened the  Boston Dry Goods Store in 1883 at the Allen Block at the southwest corner of Spring and Temple Street, stating that his store offered "fine stocks and refined 'Boston' service." In 1891, J. W. Robinson died at the age of 45 and his son, Henry Winchester Robinson, came from Boston to Los Angeles to take over the business, and the "Boston Dry Goods Store" was renamed the "J. W. Robinson Company" in honor of its late founder.

1886–1895: 171–173 Spring Street store

When Robinson's moved again in 1895, Nathaniel Blackstone, brother-in-law of J.W. Robinson, moved into the vacated space and founded Blackstone's Dry Goods, which would become a single-location downtown department store in its own right.

Mr. C. W. R. Ford, who had owned his own wholesale store at 522 Market Street in San Francisco, married Robinson's widow and took over as president of the Robinson's company.

1895: Broadway, "across from City Hall"

From 1880 to 1890, the population of Los Angeles doubled from 50,395 to 102,479 people. In January 1895 the J. W. Robinson Co., which by that time advertised simply as "The Boston Store", announced that after only eight years at Spring Street, more spacious quarters were necessary, and that a new four-story "Boston Dry Goods Store Building" was under construction at 239 S. Broadway (razed, currently site of a parking lot), opposite the then City Hall. It was designed by Theodore Eisen and Sumner Hunt, designer of the Bradbury Building. On October 1, 1895, Robinson's opened the new store. The new building was promoted at the time as a sign that Los Angeles had come into its own as a "metropolitan center" and that it was no longer necessary to make "annual pilgrimages to San Francisco" to obtain a wide selection of fine merchandise.

The front was "Grecian" (Greek Revival) in style, of light cream brick and terra cotta. It featured an elaborate Corinthian-style cornice crowning the façade. Above it rose a high parapet broken by a high-relief entresol panel. All of this was surmounted by  elaborate acroteria. 60-foot-long, 19.5-foot-high plate glass windows illuminated the ground floor. Just above the second floor the façade was Colonial style and above that Doric-style features. The building had passenger and freight elevators, and skylights illuminated through to the ground floor. The first/ground floor and part of the basement were devoted to retail with a central cashier's and wrapping desk, offices were also on the ground floor, receiving and shipping were also in the basement, while the two upper floors housed the main part of the manufacturing and wholesale departments, which moved down from Temple Street. The second floor housed various merchandise departments, areas to display delicate fabrics under gas light, a desk with stationery for customers to write, and the ladies' "parlors" (restrooms).

In 1908 the store opened up a 5-story extension at the back, fronting on Hill Street. The architect was Theodore Eisen.

1915: Seventh, Grand, and Hope

As Los Angeles continued to grow, so did Robinson's business and in 1914 it announced its construction of a new $1,000,000, seven-story flagship store with over nine acres of floor space, along the south side of West Seventh Street stretching alone the complete block between Grand and Hope streets. Frederick Noonan and William Richards of Dodd & Richards were the architects. The store opened on September 7, 1915.
In 1934, the building was remodeled for between $100,000–200,000 to a "restrained Modernistic" exterior, shedding some its more exuberant Art Deco features and adding more parking facilities. Robinson's was the largest store of what became a new upscale Seventh Street shopping district to the southwest of the concentration of department stores along Broadway, with Ville de Paris (later B. H. Dyas), Coulter's, Haggarty's, and Desmond's opening stores nearby. The Robinson's store closed in 1993 and the building, 600 W. Seventh St., currently houses telecommunications (voice, data and internet servers), offices and ground-floor retail.

The store contained the following departments:
First (ground) floor: ribbons, parasols, umbrellas, laces and trimmings, lace neckwear, feather boas, ceilings, gloves, handkerchiefs, fancy boas, fancy hairpins and combs, jewelry, leather goods, stationery, men's furnishings, boy's furnishings and clothing, "bargain square"
 Second floor: art needlework, linens, sheetings, wash goods, linings, silk dress good patterns, ladies' restrooms, design room, beauty parlors and shoe shining dept.
 Third floor: cloak and suit for misses and ladies, French room for imported gowns and hats, baby shop for fine layette materials and outfitting, mourning goods, children's dresses, petticoats, blouses, millinery, sweaters, bathing suits, kimono, bathrobes, house dresses, corsets, knit underwear, muslin underwear and aprons
 Fourth floor: Rugs, draperies, pictures, brasses, statuary, cut glass, art porcelains and toys
 Fifth floor: offices, auditorium, alteration dept. and workrooms
 Sixth floor: hospital and rerserve stockroom
 Seventh floor. employee cafeteria, two outdoor "courts", women's employee restroom, large "court" and lounge for men
 Seventh/top floor: Roof garden and café

1950s-1980s
Associated Dry Goods (ADG) bought Robinson's in 1955 (the term used by CEO Edward R. Valentine in the press was that Robinson's "affiliated with" ADG.) At that time the chain's sales were $32.5 million annually, with $12 million coming from the Beverly Hills branch.

California Branch buildout 
Unlike competitors Bullock's, Desmond's, I. Magnin and Silverwoods, in the 1930s and 1940s, Robinson's did not establish branches in the outlying upscale retail districts such as Wilshire Boulevard, Pasadena, or Westwood, except for a small Palm Springs shop at the Desert Inn that was originally a Bullock's. Only starting in 1952 did it open its first of what would become about 30 branches, in Beverly Hills (see below).

The second Robinson's store was opened in Beverly Hills in 1952 on a triangular plot at the corner of Wilshire Boulevard at Santa Monica Boulevard, across a courtyard from the Beverly Hilton Hotel (1953). A small Mid-Century modern style "open in winter only" store followed in Palm Springs. A store on Colorado Boulevard in Pasadena followed. The store in Pasadena was the last free standing store as the concept of the shopping mall began to take off. The first stores adjacent or connected to shopping malls opened in Panorama City in the San Fernando Valley (late 1950s), Anaheim Plaza, on upper State Street in Santa Barbara (1960s), and Glendale. By the time J.W. Robinson's was dissolved into Robinson's-May there were almost 30 stores across Southern California from San Diego to Palm Desert to Santa Barbara.

ADG and May
Associated Dry Goods (ADG), a group of independently operated department store chains, bought Robinson's in 1957.

May Department Stores bought Associated Dry Goods and with it, Robinson's, in 1986. In 1989, May dissolved its Scottsdale, Arizona-based Goldwaters division, folding it into Robinson's, and its Phoenix-area stores were rebranded as Robinson's.

Consolidation and epilogue
In 1992, May combined Robinson's and May Company California into a single brand, Robinsons-May. The Robinson's stores became, like the former May Co. locations, a midrange department store, which market research firm NPD Group characterized as having an "identity crisis" because "they tried to be something for everyone and ended up being nothing for anyone". Federated Department Stores (which had bought Macy's in 1994 and changed its name in 2007 to Macy's, Inc.) bought May Department Stores in 2005. Robinson's-May was dissolved in 2005–6, and the former Robinson's stores were closed, sold, or turned into Macy's or Bloomingdale's branches.

Store list
California and Arizona Robinson's stores at merger with May Co. into Robinsons-May, 1992-3

Outside California

Japan

In addition, just before the acquisition by May, it had also cooperated with Ito-Yokado to form Robinson's Japan, with one location in Kasukabe, Saitama. In 2009, Robinson's Japan was acquired by Seven & I Holdings Co.

Robinson's Florida
Starting in 1972 ADG borrowed the Robinson's name to open a separate division of department stores, Robinson's of Florida, on Florida's Gulf Coast and Orlando, based in St. Petersburg, Florida. It had been founded in the 1970s as an attempt by ADG to emulate its upscale J. W. Robinson's' stores on the fast-growing Florida Gulf Coast. This newly created division grew to 10 locations. May sold this division in 1987 to Maison Blanche. Seven of the former Robinson's of Florida locations were subsequently sold by Maison Blanche to Dillard's* in 1991 while the other three became Gayfers** (which in turn was bought out by Dillard's in 1998).

References 

1883 establishments in California
1993 disestablishments in California
Companies based in Los Angeles
Defunct companies based in Greater Los Angeles
Robinson's
History of Los Angeles
Retail companies established in 1883
Retail companies disestablished in 1993
May Department Stores